Horná Potôň is a village and municipality in the Dunajská Streda District in the Trnava Region of south-west Slovakia.

History
In historical records the village was first mentioned in 1250. Until the end of World War I, it was part of Hungary and fell within the Dunaszerdahely district of Pozsony County. After the Austro-Hungarian army disintegrated in November 1918, Czechoslovakian troops occupied the area. Under the Treaty of Trianon of 1920, it became officially part of Czechoslovakia and fell within Bratislava County until 1927. In November 1938, the First Vienna Award granted the area to Hungary and it was held by Hungary until 1945. In 1940, Lögérpatony (Horná Potôň) and Benkepatony (Benkova Potôň) were unified, since it has been called in Hungarian as Felsőpatony, while in Slovak it is known as Horná Potôň. After the Soviet occupation in 1945, Czechoslovakian administration returned and the village became officially part of Czechoslovakia by the Paris Peace Treaties in 1947. In 1960, Čečinska Potôň (Csécsénypatony) was also attached to the village.

Geography
The municipality lies at an altitude of 120 metres and covers an area of 28.365 km². It has a population of about 1,762 people.

See also
 List of municipalities and towns in Slovakia

References

Genealogical resources

The records for genealogical research are available at the state archive "Statny Archiv in Bratislava, Slovakia"
 Roman Catholic church records (births/marriages/deaths): 1728-1899 (parish B)
 Reformated church records (births/marriages/deaths): 1783-1912 (parish B)

External links
Surnames of living people in Horna Poton

Villages and municipalities in Dunajská Streda District
Hungarian communities in Slovakia